The Mystic  Marriage of St. Francis is a  painting by the  Italian Renaissance artist Sassetta, now in the Musée Condé of Chantilly, France.

Description
The painting by Stefano di Giovanni di Consolo, known as il Sassetta (ca.1392–1450 or 1451) was originally part of a polyptych at Sansepolcro, where it was seen by Piero della Francesca.

It portrays St. Francis of Assisi while ideally marrying the three Theological Virtues, Faith, Hope and Charity, through the donation of a ring to them. The three virtues have differently colored dresses: red for Charity, green for Hope and white for Faith. Behind St. Francis, who wears his traditional brown monk habit, is his companion Fra' Leone.

Alternatively, the painting illustrates the public pronouncement of St. Francis's vows according to the evangelical counsels of Poverty, Chastity, and Obedience. Poverty, barefoot, is central of the three female figures, the ring being slipped on her finger as Francis makes his vow of poverty, or perfect charity; Chastity is in white, and Obedience in red. As the three women leave, Poverty glances back, her bare feet more evident. Obedience, who stood with her arms crossed during the marriage ceremony, bears away a rood cross, both symbols of the cross of Christ and that which Francis will bear as token of his obedience. Chastity bears away the lilies of purity. Poverty carries (what appears to be) a palm frond, emblematic of entry into monastic order, and the victory of spirit over flesh.

The scene is set in an idyllic landscape, between hills, castles and cultivated fields, without any attention to perspective and realism as in other Renaissance works. Sassetta was in fact one of the last painters of the Sienese Gothic school, as shown by the use of elongated figures, the delicate colors and the courtly atmosphere.

Sources
 

1450s paintings
Paintings in the collection of the Musée Condé
Gothic paintings
Religious paintings
Paintings of Francis of Assisi